Jean Plantureux (born March 23, 1951 in Paris), who goes by the professional name Plantu, is a French cartoonist specializing in political satire. His work has regularly appeared in the French newspaper Le Monde since 1972.

Early life
Jean Plantureux received his Baccalaureate from Lycée Henri-IV in 1969. Though he initially intended to pursue the study of medicine, he soon gave this up and moved to Brussels, where he enrolled in drawing courses at the École Saint-Luc.

Early professional career
Plantu returned to Paris and attempted to sell his cartoons to the French daily newspapers. He was hired by Bernard Lauzanne of Le Monde and his first cartoon, about the Vietnam War, was published on October 1, 1972. In 1974, Claude Julien, then-director of Le Monde Diplomatique, also began publishing Plantu's drawings.

In 1980 Plantu began to work with Le Journal Phosphore, a relationship which would continue until 1986. In 1982, André Laurens and Claude Lamotte, respectively the director and editor in chief of Le Monde, asked him to begin drawing cartoons for the Sunday edition of the newspaper. In September 1987, Plantu appeared on the television show Droit de Réponse, with Michel Polac, on TF1.

In 1985, the head of Le Monde, André Fontaine, started to publish Plantu's cartoons daily, saying that this would return political satire back to its former standing as a French tradition.

1985 - 1995
In 1988 Plantu received the Mumm prize for his cartoon "Gordji chez le juge", followed by a prix de l'humour noir in 1989. In 1991, Plantu began to publish a comic in the weekly magazine L'Express, which allotted him its entire third page every week.

In 1991 Plantu met Yasser Arafat during a showing of his cartoons in Tunis. Arafat liked Plantu's cartoons so much that he drew a Star of David on a Plantu cartoon, colored it in and signed it. The following year, Plantu traveled to Israel and met Shimon Peres, whom he convinced to sign the cartoon as well. This was the first time that signatures from both the Palestine Liberation Organization and the Israeli government had been affixed to the same document.

1995 - 2000
Le Monde changed its methodology in 1995, causing Plantu to lose control over the subject matter of his cartoons. In 1996, Plantu had a showing of his cartoons and sculptures at the Cour de cassation (French Supreme Court) in Paris. Later that year he received the Spanish Gat Perich (International Caricature Prize). Some of his drawings and sculptures were auctioned at the Hôtel Drouot in Paris, and he received exposure in Argentina through the Alliance Française of Buenos Aires.

In 1997 Plantu opened a gallery in Khartoum, Sudan. In Budapest, the president of the Hungary, Árpád Göncz, inaugurated an exhibit of Plantu and Gabor Papai. He also opened a new gallery at the French Arts centre of Mexico City. Finally, a collection of his work was exhibited at CRAC in Valence, France.

In 1998 a stamp worth three French francs was produced by the French postal service, with the proceeds dedicated to Médecins Sans Frontières (Doctors Without Borders). A total of 8.5 million stamps were produced. To celebrate the 50th anniversary of the Universal Declaration of Human Rights, UNESCO published several foreign collections illustrated by Plantu. His drawings were translated into Chinese, Japanese, Ukrainian, and other languages. That same year he opened a gallery at the French Institute of Port-au-Prince, Haiti.

In 1999, Plantu opened a gallery at the University of Colombo, Sri Lanka. Some of his drawings were exhibited in Iran at the Museum of Contemporary Art of Teheran; in the Hotel of Rohan; at the Museum Jean-Jaurès de Castres; and at the French Arts centre of Singapore.

In September 2000 a controversy arose involving the distribution of a Plantu drawing showing Jacques Chirac copulating with a sleeping Marianne. An exhibit of Plantu and Daumier written by curator Cyril Dumas opened in the Museum of Yves Brayer les Baux de Provence. The exhibition described traits shared by both caricaturists. Another installation opened that year at the French Arts centre in Yaoundé, Cameroun.

2001 - present
Plantu's art was featured in the Festival of the Caricature in Ankara in 2001. In 2002, he met United Nations Secretary-General, Kofi Annan, to discuss an upcoming international conference of news cartoonists in Paris. A thesis was published by Rémi Pézerat entitled "La signification politique des dessins de Plantu (1972-2000)"(The Political Significance of the Cartoons of Plantu (1972-2000)). Plantu celebrated the publishing of his 15,000th cartoon and his thirtieth anniversary with Le Monde, and launched his own website.

In 2003 an exhibit of his drawings was opened at the Carnavalet Museum. Toward the end of the year another exhibit opened at the Library of Alexandria in Egypt, as well as a street exhibition in Angers, France.

In 2004 his drawings were shown to the French National Assembly in February, and his 40th book, Ils pourraient dire merci! was published.

On February 3, 2006 he responded to the Jyllands-Posten Muhammad cartoons controversy by publishing a drawing in the first page of Le Monde representing Muhammad using many copies of the sentence "I may not draw Muhammad".

In 2009, another controversy occurred when the group America Needs Fatima launched a vast e-mail campaign against Plantu because of a drawing on Jesus distributing condoms, instead of loaves of bread, to poor people in Africa.

In 2015, his cartoon, which shows an IDF soldier firing his gun at Palestinian civilians, joined by a stereotypical religious Jew, depicted with a long beard, hat and coat, and even a rifle on his shoulder made a serious scandal and rose emotions on a 'Blood libel' accusation against Israeli Jews.

Bibliography 
 Plantu: Drôle de peuple - Komisches Volk! Dessins sur l'Allemagne - Politische Karikaturen zu Deutschland. (exhibition catalogue with political cartoons about Germany, bilingual: French-German) Schaltzeit Verlag, Berlin 2011.

External links
The official Plantu Site
Plantu Interview at Toons Mag
Plantu American Lecture Series
750 page pdf "La signification politique des dessins de Plantu (1972-2000)" (French)

References

1951 births
Living people
Artists from Paris
French editorial cartoonists
French satirists
French political satire
Lycée Henri-IV alumni